The Schar School of Policy and Government (SSPG), formerly known as the George Mason University School of Policy, Government, and International Affairs (SPGIA), is the public policy school of George Mason University headquartered in Arlington, Virginia roughly 4 miles (6.4 km) west of Washington, D.C., with a satellite campus in suburban Fairfax County, Virginia. Established as Northern Virginia's first public policy school, the constituent college offers bachelor's-level undergraduate as well as postgraduate degrees in political science and its specific sub-fields such as international relations, public policy, public administration, international security (national security, security studies, intelligence studies, intelligence analysis), and urban studies along with specialized postgraduate education through graduate certificates, master's, and doctoral degree programs in fields such as biodefense, international commerce, homeland security, emergency management, counterterrorism, illicit trade analysis, organization development, and knowledge management as well as executive education programs with students eventually choosing one or two degree programs to join, but having the option of taking elective courses from across several sub-fields at both the undergraduate and postgraduate levels. While it primarily educates and conducts research in subjects related to politics, government, international affairs, and public policy-related economics, as well as the study of regional issues affecting the Washington D.C. metropolitan area, the school is home to several prominent centers, research institutes, and think tanks dealing with security studies, counterterrorism, transportation policy, and environmental science including the Michael V. Hayden Center for Intelligence, Policy, and International Security, the Center for Security Policy Studies, Center for Transportation Public-Private Partnership Policy, the Terrorism, Transnational Crime and Corruption Center (TraCCC), and the Center for Energy Science and Policy; the School of Policy and Government also cooperates with the Antonin Scalia Law School’s National Security Institute in conducting research around legal issues pertaining to national security. The school is also the psephology partner of The Washington Post, collaborating on electoral polling and analysis for the paper since 2016, the two hold an A+ rating for historical accuracy and methodology in polling from FiveThirtyEight. 

The Schar School is accredited by the Network of Schools of Public Policy, Affairs, and Administration, and the Association of Professional Schools of International Affairs (APSIA), a global consortium of prominent schools of international affairs. As part of George Mason University, the school is a Very High Research Activity (R1) academic unit in the Carnegie Classification of Institutions of Higher Education. It receives approximately $2 million in sponsored funding for academic research annually. The school's budget was $18 million for the 2019–2020 academic year.

History 

The public policy section of the school was founded as a think tank/public policy research institute in 1990 and evolved into a graduate-only School of Public Policy in 2000; while the generalist political science and international affairs section was founded in 1990 as the Department of Public and International Affairs in the College of Humanities and Social Sciences. In August 2014 the School of Public Policy began providing public policy and public administration education at the undergraduate level, then merged with the Undergraduate and Graduate Department of Public and International Affairs (then a department of the College of Humanities and Social Sciences’) to form the George Mason University School of Policy, Government, and International Affairs. Thus, the modern Schar School of Policy and Government was created by the merger of the former public policy graduate school and the undergraduate and graduate level political science and international affairs faculty of the American liberal arts college-type college of arts and sciences into a unified autonomous research-intensive constituent college public policy school offering both undergraduate education and graduate education in public policy, public administration, international affairs, and other political science subfields - even into undergraduate programs that combine all of the aforementioned sub-fields of political science to broaden the range of skill attainment afforded to undergraduate students and graduate degrees with a specialized focus for those desiring to gain advanced-level subject matter expertise in a specific focus area.  

In May 2016, the school was renamed the Schar School of Policy and Government in recognition of a $10 million gift from businessman and philanthropist Dwight Schar.

In 2016, the Schar School announced it would partner with The Washington Post to conduct political polling. The Washington Post-Schar School polls correctly predicted that Hillary Clinton would win Virginia in the 2016 presidential race, Democrat Doug Jones would win Alabama's 2017 senatorial race, and Democrat Ralph Northam would win Virginia's 2017 gubernatorial election.

As a byproduct of George Mason University developing out of the University of Virginia, one of the oldest universities in the United States, the Schar School inherited the names of some of its programs, referring to courses of study in politics as government degrees rather than the more contemporary term political science, generally adopted by programs established from the 1960s onward.

Campus 

The school's primary campus is in the Virginia Square neighborhood of Arlington, Virginia, with the headquarters in Van Metre Hall. Undergraduate programs offered by the school are primarily held at the university's flagship campus in Fairfax, Virginia, with night school offerings in both Arlington and Fairfax. In 2013, political scientist Mark J. Rozell became Acting Dean, taking over the role in a permanent capacity in 2016.  During his tenure the school has averaged 80 faculty and a student body of approximately 2,000. The school completed the 244,000 sq ft academic headquarters, Van Metre Hall, in 2010. In 2020 the school began a $250 million expansion directly adjacent, as part of the Commonwealth of Virginia's bid to locate Amazon HQ2 in the nearby National Landing neighborhood. 

The Schar School is located in Arlington, Virginia approximately 15 miles away from the university's main campus in Fairfax. The 5.2-acre campus is in the Virginia Square neighborhood which has a highly educated (86% with bachelor's degrees or higher) and affluent (median household income of $112,000) population.  The Arlington campus was once the site of the now-defunct Kann's Department Store, and the property was acquired as the location for the university's law school by the Commonwealth of Virginia in 1979.

The Arlington campus consists of a 256,000-square-foot academic building with a 300-seat auditorium, a 5,600-square-foot multipurpose room, a library and an outdoor public plaza. As part of its successful bid to bring Amazon's HQ2 to Virginia, the state committed up to $125 million over the next 20 years to expand the Arlington campus with an emphasis on research and technology.

Academics

Faculty 
In early 2020 Saskia Popescu became the first infectious disease epidemiologist to join the school amid the COVID-19 pandemic.

In September 2019, Michael Morell, former acting Director of the CIA, joined the Schar School as distinguished visiting professor.

In August 2019 Andrew McCabe, former acting director of the FBI, announced he was joining the faculty as a distinguished visiting professor.

In March 2018 Terry McAuliffe, former Governor of Virginia, was named a visiting professor at the Schar School, teaching and delivering guest lectures. He since went on leave while campaigning as a candidate for the 2021 Virginia gubernatorial election.

In 2014 Larry Pfeiffer director of the White House Situation Room during the Obama administration, and prior chief of staff of the CIA, joined the Schar School.

In 2009 Michael Hayden and Robert Deitz joined the school together as permanent members of the faculty. The former, a previous director of both the CIA and NSA, and the latter serving as chief lawyer at both during the same period, their appointment elicited some criticism for the pair's alleged role in mass surveillance. Hayden later led the creation of the Michael V. Hayden Center within the school, with Deitz serving as a board member.

Robert Deitz, Former general counsel to the director of the CIA, NSA, and NGA.

In the 1990s Ken Alibek and Sergei Popov, former senior Soviet biological warfare scientists, joined the school, subsequently spearheading the creation of its biodefense program.

Ellen Laipson, Former CEO of The Stimson Center and former Vice Chair of the National Intelligence Council that reports to the Office of the Director of National Intelligence

Gregory Koblentz, International Weapons of Mass Destruction expert.

Colin Dueck, Foreign policy fellow at the American Enterprise Institute.

Michael Hunzeker, Assistant director of the George Mason University Center for Security Policy Studies.

Ming Wan, Associate dean of the Schar School of Policy and Government, and professor of East Asian political economy.

Stuart Malawer, Professor of law and national security.

Guadalupe Correa-Cabrera, Professor of comparative politics and US–Mexico policy.

Jeremy Mayer, Former State Department instructor and professor of government.

James Pfiffner, Professor emeritus of American government.

D Matthew Scherer, Professor of political theory and Constitutional law.

Bonnie Stabile, Professor of public policy, gender and health policy.

David Priess, Senior Fellow and former presidential daily briefer at the CIA.

Louise Shelley, director of the Terrorism, Transnational Crime and Corruption Center (TraCCC).

Degrees 

The Schar School offers students doctorate (PhD), master's, graduate certificate, bachelor's, and academic minors' programs  such as:

 Doctorate programs
 Doctor of Philosophy in Biodefense (PhD)
 International Security Concentration 
 Terrorism and Homeland Security Concentration 
 Technology and Weapons of Mass Destruction Concentration 
 Doctor of Philosophy in Political Science (PhD)
 American Government and Politics Major Field 
 Comparative Politics Major Field 
 International Relations Major Field 
 Public Administration Major Field 
 Doctor of Philosophy in Public Policy (PhD)
 Master's degree programs 
 Master of Science in Biodefense (MS)
 Master of Arts in Global Commerce and Policy or International Commerce and Policy (MA)
 Global Finance, Investment and Trade (GFIT) Concentration 
 Global Development and Governance (GDGV) Concentration 
 Global Risk and Strategy (GFIT) Concentration 
 Master of Arts in International Security (MA)
 Intelligence (IN) Concentration [Intelligence Studies and Intelligence Analysis]  
 Peace Operations (PO) Concentration
 Transnational Challenges (TC) Concentration
 Master of Science in Organization Development and Knowledge Management (MS)
 Master of Arts in Political Science (MA)
 International Security (INLS) Concentration 
 American Government and Politics Specialization
 Comparative Politics Specialization
 International Relations Specialization
 Master of Public Administration (MPA)
 Administration of Justice (ADJ) Concentration
 Emergency Management and Homeland Security (EMHS) Concentration
 Environmental Science and Public Policy (EVPP) Concentration
 Human Resources Management (HRM) Concentration
 International Management (IM) Concentration
 Nonprofit Management (NPMG) Concentration
 Policy Studies (PS) Concentration
 Public Management (PMG) Concentration
 Public and Nonprofit Finance (PNF) Concentration
 State and Local Government (SLG) Concentration
 Managing Across Sectors (MAS) Concentration
 Master of Public Policy (MPP)
 Graduate Certificates 
 Graduate Certificate in Biodefense
 Graduate Certificate in Emergency Management and Homeland Security
 Graduate Certificate in Global Economic Policy
 Graduate Certificate in Global Health and Security
 Graduate Certificate in Illicit Trade Analysis
 Graduate Certificate in National Security and Public Policy
 Graduate Certificate in Nonprofit Management
 Graduate Certificate in Public Management
 Graduate Certificate in Science, Technology, and Security
 Graduate Certificate in Strategic Trade
 Graduate Certificate in Terrorism and Homeland Security
 Bachelor's degrees
 Bachelor of Arts in Government and International Politics (BA)
 American Institutions and Processes (AMIP) Concentration
 Comparative Politics (CPOL) Concentration
 International Political Economy (IPE) Concentration
 International Relations (INTR) Concentration
 Law, Philosophy and Governance (LPGV) Concentration
 Political Analysis (PA) Concentration
 Political Behavior and Identity Politics (PBIP) Concentration
 Public Policy and Administration (PPA) Concentration
 Individualized Concentration (IND)
 Philosophy, Politics, and Economics (PPE) Concentration
 Bachelor of Science in Public Administration (BS)
 Administration and Management (ADMM)
 Public Policy (PUBP)
 Nonprofit Management (NPMG)
 US Government Institutions (USGI)
 Economic Policy Analysis (ECPA)
 International Political Economy (IPE)
 Individualized Concentration (IND)
Bachelor of Arts in International Security and Law (BA)
 Undergraduate Minors
 American Government
 Global Systems
 Government Analytics
 International Security
 International/Comparative Studies 
 Legal Studies
 Political Communication
 Public Policy and Management
 Urban and Suburban Studies
Interdisciplinary and Dual Degree Programs
Master of Arts in Global Affairs (MA) hosted by the College of Humanities and Social Sciences but encompassing several fields of study and cooperation with other constituent colleges  
Academic Cooperation Varies by Concentrations 
At George Mason University the academic discipline known as global studies goes by the term "global affairs"
Bachelor of Arts in Global Affairs (BA) hosted by the College of Humanities and Social Sciences but encompassing several fields of study and cooperation with other constituent colleges 
Academic Cooperation Varies by Concentrations
At George Mason University the academic discipline known as global studies goes by the term "global affairs"
Dual Juris Doctor and Master of Public Policy (JD/MPP) degree with the Antonin Scalia Law School 
Graduate Certificate in Environmental and Sustainability Management with the College of Science's Department of Environmental Science and Policy, Volgenau School of Engineering, and the George Mason School of Business
Undergraduate Minor in Criminology, Law and Society offered in cooperation with the College of Humanities and Social Science's Department of Criminology, Law and Society
Undergraduate Minor in Intelligence Analysis and Intelligence Studies with the College of Humanities and Social Science's Department of Criminology, Law and Society, the Jimmy and Rosalynn Carter School for Peace and Conflict Resolution, and the College of Science's Department of Geography and Geoinformation Science
Undergraduate Minor in Political Communication with the Department of Communication in the College of Humanities and Social Sciences
Undergraduate Minor in Government Analytics with the College of Science's Department of Computational and Data Science
Undergraduate Concentration in Philosophy, Politics, and Economics (PPE) with the College of Humanities and Social Sciences' Department of Philosophy and Department of Economics

Graduate education 
The PhD Program includes doctorates in biodefense, political science, and public policy. The master's degree programs include biodefense, international commerce and policy, international security, organization development and knowledge management, political science, public administration, public policy, and transportation policy, operations, and logistics. Graduate certificate programs are offered in biodefense, emergency management and homeland security, global health and security, national security and public policy, nonprofit management, public management, science, technology, and security, and terrorism and homeland security.

Biodefense program 
The Schar School's biodefense degree program was the first the United States, led by Ken Alibek and Sergei Popov, senior Soviet bioweaponeers who defected to the U.S. in 1992, and Charles Bailey, former biodefense scientist at USAMRIID, Fort Detrick, Maryland. Credited with creating and weaponizing the most virulent and deadly strain of anthrax ever synthesized while leading the Soviet biological warfare agency Biopreparat, Alibek joined the faculty at George Mason in the late 1990s, spearheading the biodefense program's creation in 2003. Popov, a scientist at the VECTOR Institute who created a highly virulent and deadly strain of the plague bacterium by splicing into it the gene for the diphtheria toxin, first defected to the United Kingdom before later coming to the US and joining Alibek at Mason. Alibek subsequently served as distinguished professor of medical microbiology, as well as the director of the Center for Biodefense. He also developed the plans for the university's biosafety level three (BSL-3) research facility, securing federal and state homeland security grants for its construction. Alibek left the school in the late 2000s, while Popov remained on the faculty into the mid-2010s, leading the U.S. Department of Health and Human Services-funded National Center for Biodefense and Infectious Disease.

In 2011, members of the Mason biodefense program worked with the Russian department at Cornell University and the Carnegie Corporation to produce The Anthrax Diaries, a documentary on the Soviet bioweapons program and the scientists involved.

The program continues to receive federal support and is currently led by Gregory Koblentz.

Undergraduate education

Bachelor's degrees and academic concentrations 
Three undergraduate bachelor's degree programs are offered, a Bachelor of Arts in Government and International Politics, a Bachelor of Science in Public Administration, and a Bachelor of Arts in International Security and Law. The Bachelor of Arts in Government and International Politics consists of specialized academic concentrations in Public Policy and Administration, International Relations, Political Analysis, International Political Economy,  Philosophy, Politics, and Economics, Comparative Politics, American Institutions and Processes, and Law, Philosophy, and Governance. The Bachelor of Science in Public Administration consists of specialized academic concentrations in Administration and Management, Economic Policy Analysis, International Political Economy, Nonprofit Management, Public Policy, U.S. Government Institutions, and an Individualized Concentration.

Academic minors 
The School of Policy and Government also offers undergraduate academic minors that can be taken along with a bachelor's academic major in any field. The minors offered are: Urban and Suburban Studies, Public Policy and Management, Political Philosophy, Legal Studies, International Security, International and Comparative Studies, Global Systems, Government Analytics, and American Government.

Interdisciplinary programs 
In addition to courses and degree programs solely administered by the Schar School of Policy and Government, the public policy school also partners with other constituent colleges and academic departments to offer interdisciplinary degrees. The academic concentration in Philosophy, Politics, and Economics (PPE) is jointly run with the College of Humanities and Social Science's Department of Economics and Department of Philosophy. The Political Communication minor is co-administered with the Department of Communication. Government Analytics minor is co-taught by the College of Science's Department of Computational and Data Science. The interdisciplinary Global Affairs (global studies) bachelor's and master's program is administered by the College of Humanities and Social Sciences but contains a considerably large concentration of courses from the School of Policy and Government among other academic departments. Although intelligence studies within the international security master's program at the graduate level are administered directly by the public policy school, undergraduate level Intelligence Analysis and Intelligence Studies minors are administered by the Department of Criminology, Law and Society with a cross-disciplinary course load in addition taken from international affairs, sociology, anthropology, the Jimmy and Rosalynn Carter School for Peace and Conflict Resolution (peace and conflict studies), and the College of Science's Department of Geography and Geoinformation Science's geospatial intelligence program. An undergraduate minor in Criminology, Law and Society is offered in cooperation with the College of Humanities and Social Science's Department of Criminology, Law and Society; which share some common subject mater and cross-listed courses. The public policy school also has a joint program with the Antonin Scalia Law School where a person can receive a dual Juris Doctor (JD)-Master’s of Public Policy (MPP) degree. The School of Policy and Government also operates the Center for Energy Science and Policy in partnership with the College of Science and the School of Business.

Top Employers and Industries 

 Booz Allen Hamilton
 United States Congress (House of Representatives, Senate, and Legislative Branch Agencies)
 Central Intelligence Agency (CIA)
 Federal Bureau of Investigation (FBI)
 National Security Agency (NSA)
 Foreign Service Institute (FSI)
 Middle East Institute
 National Consortium for the Study of Terrorism and Responses to Terrorism
 Law Firms (in general)
 Think Tanks, Policy Institutes, and Research Institutes (in general)
 Nonprofit Organizations, Non-Governmental Organizations, and the Voluntary Sector (in general)
 Lobbying Groups and Government Relations (in general)
 Legislative Assistance or Legislative Affairs (in general)
 U.S. Federal Government (in general)
 Local Government (in general)
 State Government (in general)
 Management Consulting and other Consulting Firms (in general)
 Defense Industry, Defense Contracting, and Aerospace Manufacturing (in general)
 Intelligence Agencies and Intelligence Analysis Contracting Firms (in general)
 International or Intergovernmental Organizations and Multilateral Initiatives (in general)
 Public Sector (in general)
 Private Sector (in general)
 U.S. Department of State
 U.S. Department of Commerce
 U.S. Department of Defense (DOD)
 U.S. Defense Threat Reduction Agency
 U.S. Marine Corps
 Defense Logistics Agency
 U.S Naval Research Laboratory
 National Geospatial-Intelligence Agency (NGA)
 Office of the Director of National Intelligence (ODNI)
 U.S. Securities and Exchange Commission (SEC)
 Executive Office of the President of the United States
 Fairfax County Government
 Partnership for Public Service
 Loudoun County Government
 FedBid, Inc.
 U.S. Department of Health and Human Services (HHS)
 Centers for Disease Control and Prevention (CDC)
 Food and Drug Administration (FDA)
 Deloitte
 General Services Administration (GSA)
 MIT Lincoln Laboratory
 Science Applications International Corporation (SAIC)
 U.S. Department of Agriculture
 U.S. Department of Justice (DOJ) 
 U.S. Department of Homeland Security (DHS)
 Federal Emergency Management Agency (FEMA)
 U.S. Department of Housing and Urban Development (HUD)
 U.S. Department of the Interior (DOI)
 U.S. Geological Survey (USGS)
 Federal Judiciary of the United States and Judicial Branch Agencies
 BAE Systems Inc.
 Inter-American Development Bank
 International Monetary Fund
 Northrop Grumman
 World Bank Group
 U.S. Department of the Treasury
 Leidos
 U.S. Department of Energy (DOE)
 National Nuclear Security Administration (NNSA)
 U.S. Department of Education
 Accenture
 Organization of American States (OAS)
 Pew Charitable Trusts
 U.S. Department of Labor
 Decisive Analytics Corporation
 Federal Election Commission (FEC)
 IBM
 North Atlantic Treaty Organization (NATO)
 Arlington County Government
 ICF International
 Lockheed Martin
 Metropolitan Washington Council of Governments (MWCOG)
 Pan American Development Foundation
 PricewaterhouseCoopers (PwC)

References

George Mason University
Education in Arlington County, Virginia
Education in Fairfax County, Virginia
Public policy schools
Educational institutions established in 2014
2014 establishments in Virginia
Schools of international relations in the United States
Public administration schools in the United States